Forrest City School District 7 (FCSD) is a school district headquartered in Forrest City, Arkansas.

In addition to Forrest City it serves other areas in central St. Francis County, including Caldwell, Colt, Madison, and Widener.

The board has seven members.

Schools
 Secondary
 Forrest City High School (9-12)
 Forrest City Junior High School (7-8)
 Primary
 Sixth Grade Academy
 Stewart Elementary School (3-5)
 Central Elementary School (PreK-2nd Grade)
 Pre-Kindergarten
 ABC Pre-School
 Alternative
 Mustang Academy (9-12)

References

External links
 

School districts in Arkansas
Education in St. Francis County, Arkansas